The 2012 Letran Knights men's basketball team represented Colegio de San Juan de Letran in the 88th season of the National Collegiate Athletic Association in the Philippines. The men's basketball tournament for the school year 2012-13 began on June 23, 2012, and the host school for the season was also Letran.

The Knights finished the double round-robin eliminations at third place with 12 wins against 6 losses. In the opening night, Kevin Alas sets a career-high 31 points against the San Sebastian Stags. Alas broke his own record again in the Final Four, netting 43 points, against the Stags and forcing them in a do-or-die match. In the knockout game, the Knights dropped an upset axe against the second-seed Stags and finally barge into the Finals to set a best-of-three series against the defending champions San Beda Red Lions. However, the Knights lost to the Red Lions in three games. Kevin Alas was named member of the Mythical Five, while Raymond Almazan was awarded with the NCAA Defensive Player of the Year.

Roster 

 Depth chart Depth chart

Suspensions 
The NCAA Management Committee slapped Letran center Jam Cortes with a one-game suspension for a disqualifying foul he committed during the first-round encounter against the Arellano Chiefs. Meanwhile, Jonathan Belorio was given only a stern warning.

Letran big man Kristoffer Alas was given a one-game suspension for a disqualifying foul he committed during the Final Four game against the San Sebastian Stags. He sat out in the winner-take-all match.

Letran head coach Louie Alas avoided suspension by issuing an apology for his "throat-slitting" motion during Game 1 of the NCAA Finals.

NCAA Season 88 games results 

Elimination games were played in a double round-robin format. All games were aired on AKTV.

Source: PBA-Online

Awards

References 

Letran Knights basketball team seasons